Alper Tuzcu is a composer and a music producer. Tuzcu has released three albums, Macondo (2021), Aurora (2018) and Between 12 Waters (2016).  On his 2020 EP, 'Migrante', Tuzcu has composed a poem by Chilean poet Pablo Neruda, called "Con Ella". On his 2021 EP, 'Raiz', Tuzcu collaborated with the percussionist of Snarky Puppy, Marcelo Woloski.

Career
In 2012, Tuzcu performed at Umbria Jazz Festival, where he won the Berklee On The Road scholarship to study full-time at Berklee College of Music in Boston.

In 2014, Tuzcu formed the Brazil-Mediterranean fusion music duo Aigua with Brazilian singer Bruna Lucchesi at València, Spain. Between 2014 and 2015, he also recorded twice with Grammy winner producer Javier Limon (Paco de Lucia, Buika, Chucho Valdes, Bebo Valdes, Mariza, Aynur) in Spain.

In late 2015, he started his duo project "Ark" Boston, where the duo performed at YouBloom Festival in Los Angeles, Sidewalk in New York and Hard Rock Cafe in Boston. In 2016, the duo recorded and released their first EP "Lately". With Ark, Tuzcu was featured at the Emmy nominated "502 Sessions" at Dedham TV and WEMF FM; along with the international media as well.

In 2016, Tuzcu's first album Between 12 Waters was published by Palma Records, featuring songs inspired from 12 different cultures around the world.

In 2017, Tuzcu released his first EP 'Lines'.

In 2018, Alper Tuzcu released his second solo album 'Aurora' featuring vocalists LASYA, Micaella Cattani, Kat Kennedy and many other musicians.

In 2019, Tuzcu composed and recorded bossa Nova song 'Felicidade', featuring Brazilian vocalist Helena Beltrão. The song reached more than 1 million streams on Spotify worldwide. In 2020, he released his lo-fi single 'Uzaklarda', which made it to Spotify’s editorial playlist “Turkey Viral 50”.

In 2020, Tuzcu's new projects 'Migrante' and 'Imagina' were released. 

In 2021, Tuzcu's new projects 'Raíz' and 'Macondo' were released.

In 2022, Tuzcu has released a collaborative single with Uruguayan-Canadian singer, Gisun. He also released his single 'Tramuntana' featuring LASYA. 

In 2023, Tuzcu has released his single, Espírito, which mixes Brazilian samba and Uruguayan candombe rhythms.

Discography

Albums and EPs 
 2021: Macondo (Palma Records)
 2021: Raíz (Palma Records)
 2020: Imagina (Palma Records)
 2020: Migrante (Palma Records)
 2018: Aurora (Palma Records)
 2017: Lines (Palma Records)
 2016: Between 12 Waters (Palma Records)

Singles 
 2023: Espírito 
 2022: Tramuntana 
 2021: Azul 
 2020: Uç 
 2020: My Life Is Going On 
 2020: Uzaklarda 
 2019: Felicidade 
 2019: Morning View 
 2019: Guide Me Away (Instrumental) 
 2018: Joga

Collaborations 
 2022: Ancla, with Gisun
 2017: Singing In My Own Key (Forza Press), with Valerie Giglio
 2016: Lately by Ark (Alper Tuzcu and Danielle Angeloni)

References

Berklee College of Music alumni
Turkish songwriters
Turkish jazz singers
Living people
Musicians from Istanbul
21st-century Turkish singers
Year of birth missing (living people)